Yemyung Graduate University is a private graduate school located in Seocho-gu district, in Seoul, South Korea.

See also
List of colleges and universities in South Korea
List of colleges and universities
Education in South Korea

External links
Official seminary website, in Korean
Rhema Mission founded the Yaeil Seminary

Universities and colleges in Seoul